Lorentz Medal is a distinction awarded every four years by the Royal Netherlands Academy of Arts and Sciences.  It was established in 1925 on the occasion of the 50th anniversary of the doctorate of Hendrik Lorentz. The medal is given for important contributions to theoretical physics, though in the past there have been some experimentalists among its recipients.

The first winner, Max Planck, was personally selected by Lorentz. Eleven of the 23 award winners later received a Nobel Prize. The Lorentz medal is ranked fifth in a list of most prestigious international academic awards in physics.

Recipients

See also

 List of physics awards

References

Physics awards
Dutch honorary society awards
 
Science and technology in the Netherlands
Hendrik Lorentz

External links

 Official Lorentz Medal site at the Royal Academy
 Lorentz Medal site at the Institute Lorentz